Constructor may refer to:

Science and technology
 Constructor (object-oriented programming), object-organizing method 
 Constructors (Formula One), person or group who builds the chassis of a car in auto racing, especially Formula One
 Constructor, an entity in Constructor theory, a theory of everything developed by physicist David Deutsch in 2012

Other uses
 Constructor (video game), a 1997 PC game by Acclaim, the prequel of Constructor: Street Wars
 Constructor Group AS, a Norwegian-based group specialising in shelving, racking and storage systems
 Construction worker, a builder, especially a construction company or a manager of builders

See also
 Assembler (disambiguation)